Peter Trevor Collingwood (6 May 1920 – 23 September 2016) was an English-born actor who appeared in theatre roles, films, miniseries and serials from 1938 to 2003 in his native England and Australia. Collingwood was known for his portrayal of judges, military men and upper-crust befuddled types. He was also a playwright.

Biography

Early life
Collingwood was born in Kent(some sources give, Farnham, Surrey), England on 6 May 1920. He enrolled in the Embassy School of Acting at the Embassy Theatre, London, in 1937. His first professional acting job was in Wang Shifu's Chinese play The Western Chamber at London's Torch Theatre in 1938.

Navy service
During the Second World War, Collingwood served in the British Navy, including on the Greek submarine  as liaison officer, but was discharged due to eye sight problems.

Theatre and film roles
After the war, Collingwood joined Amersham Repertory Theatre, followed by the Young Vic Company, and a number of other companies. In 1950 he married Margery Shaw. They moved to Perth, Scotland where he worked for the Perth Repertory Company. During this time, he wrote the farce Gathering Nuts, which was performed by the company, as well as by a number of other repertory companies.

In 1953, Collingwood returned to London with his family—daughter Julia, stepsons Christopher and Michael—where he worked regularly on stage, in film, and on television.

In 1961, with Margery and step-son Michael, Collingwood travelled overland to Sri Lanka, then by ship to Perth, Australia. From late 1961 to 1963, he worked at the Perth Playhouse.

The family returned to England for two years, during which he appeared in a number of successful West End shows, including Inadmissible Evidence, Meals on Wheels, and I Love you Mrs Patterson.

In 1967, Collingwood emigrated to Australia, first living in Perth before settling near Sydney in Balmain, New South Wales. He worked for many Sydney theatre companies including the Old Tote, Nimrod Theatre, Belvoir Theatre Company, the independent and Sydney Theatre Company Between 1970 and 1972 he was director of the Marian Street Theatre.

Television
Collingwood appeared in serial roles, both dramatic and comedic, including Homicide, Division 4, Mother and Son,  A Country Practice, Police Rescue, Home and Away (as Bert King), and Always Greener.

Television roles also included Lord John Russell in Edward the Seventh and Mr. Dunkley in Are You Being Served?.

Death
Collingwood retired in 2003 and died 23 September 2016 at the age of 96.

Selected filmography

Appearances in movies 

 River Beat (1954) - Coroner
 Up the Creek (1958) - Chippy
 Further Up the Creek (1958) - Chippy
 The Green Helmet (1961) - Charlie
 Morgan – A Suitable Case for Treatment (1966) - Geoffrey
 Picnic at Hanging Rock (1975) - Colonel Fitzhubert
  Fast Talking (1984) - School Principal

Appearances in miniseries 
 The Timeless Land, ABC Television (Australia), 1980 - Governor Phillip
 Under Capricorn, 1983 - Governor
 Coral Island, 1983 - Reverend McNab
 The Dismissal, 1983 - Tun Abdul Razak
 A Difficult Woman, ABC Television (Australia), 1998 - Chris Fitzgerald

Notes and references

External links 

 

1920 births
2016 deaths
Place of death missing
Australian male television actors
English male television actors
20th-century Australian male actors
20th-century English male actors
British emigrants to Australia
Male actors from Kent
Royal Navy officers of World War II